Valerio Corte (Venice, 1530 – Genoa, 1580) was an Italian painter and alchemist of the Renaissance.

He was the father of the painter Cesare Corte, and is known to have been acquainted with Titian. He was a topic of the Rafaello Soprani. He travelled to France as a mercenary. He helped introduce venetian painting styles, both by works and his work as an art merchant, to Genoa, where he befriended Luca Cambiaso. Few of his works are documented. He is said to have sold all his property to fund his research on alchemy, and died a pauper in Genoa.

References 

1530 births
1580 deaths
16th-century alchemists
Painters from Venice
Italian alchemists